In mathematics, there are different results that share the common name of the Ky Fan inequality.  The Ky Fan inequality presented here is used in game theory to investigate the existence of an equilibrium.
Another Ky Fan inequality is an inequality involving the geometric mean and arithmetic mean of two sets of real numbers of the unit interval.

Statement
   is lower semicontinuous for every  and
  is concave for every .
Then there exists  such that

References

Game theory